Xenotilapia ochrogenys is a species of cichlid endemic to Lake Tanganyika where it prefers areas with sandy substrates.  This species can reach a length of  TL.  It can also be found in the aquarium trade.

References

External links
 Photograph

ochrogenys
Fish described in 1914
Taxonomy articles created by Polbot